Turbaza "Yunost" is a rural locality (a selo) in Souzginskoye Rural Settlement of Mayminsky District, the Altai Republic, Russia. The population was 52 as of 2016.

Geography 
Turbaza "Yunost" is located on the Katun River, 26 km south of Mayma (the district's administrative centre) by road. Cheremshanka is the nearest rural locality.

References 

Rural localities in Mayminsky District